Nashville is an unincorporated community in Darke County, in the U.S. state of Ohio.

History
A former variant name of Nashville was Darke. A post office called Darke was established in 1849, and remained in operation until 1903. Nashville also had a church and a country store.

References

Unincorporated communities in Darke County, Ohio
Unincorporated communities in Ohio